Micheldever Station is a village in Micheldever, a parish of Hampshire, England.
Following the construction of the 'Andover Road' railway station (later renamed Micheldever), a cluster of houses and small shops including The Canada Stores were attracted to the area. No shops remain, though there is a tyre merchant and trailer supplier trading there.

The village has a pub, The Dove Inn.

The village is about 2.4 miles north of Micheldever, the village after which the station is named.

References

External links
 The Dove Inn
Micheldever Parish Council (new website in 2018)

Villages in Hampshire